Masjid Alkaff Kampung Melayu (Jawi: مسجد الكافف كامڤوڠ ملايو), is a mosque located on the junction of Kaki Bukit Avenue 1 and Bedok Reservoir Road in Bedok, Singapore. The institution mainly serves worshippers from the Bedok Reservoir area.

History 
The history of the institution can be traced since 1932 when it was originally known as Masjid Alkaff. Located on what was formerly the extension of the Jalan Eunos Malay Settlement extension of Kaki Bukit, the original kampung styled mosque was built with an endowment from the Alkaff family. Due to redevelopment of the area in the 1980s, the surrounding area was flattened and made way for public housing. In November 1989, the mosque was renamed to Masjid Alkaff Kampung Melayu. To make way for housing and other public infrastructure projects, groundbreaking at its current location was held on 4 January 1992. Construction took two years and was completed on 30 December 1994. The following day, it opened its doors for Friday prayer for the first time at its current location.

The new building was officiated on 29 July 1995 by Zulkifli Mohammed, then Political Secretary to the Minister without Portfolio, and MP for Jalan Besar GRC.

Transportation
The mosque is accessible from Bedok North MRT station.

See also
 Islam in Singapore
 List of mosques in Singapore

References

External links
 Infopedia

1932 establishments in British Malaya
Bedok
Mosques completed in 1994
Kaff Kg Melayu
20th-century architecture in Singapore